Bhavik Chawla is a sailor, adventurer and entrepreneur. In 2007 he became the first Asian to row across the Atlantic Ocean.

Adventures

Bhavik performed a number of adventures in sailing, traveling long distance on bicycle and by foot. Here are some notable adventures:

Rowing over Atlantic

In 2007, Bhavik rowed across the Atlantic Ocean solo, non-stop and unsupported from Spain to Antigua, to become the first Asian ever to do so. It took him 106 days; which is a record for solo rowing across the Atlantic.  He arrived at the shores of Antigua on 14 June 2007.

Stockholm to Istanbul by bicycle

In July 2004, he toured from Stockholm to Istanbul on bike, through Latvia, Lithuania, Poland, Turkey, Croatia, Italy, and Greece; a total of 3000 km. During his adventure he also tested the performance of mobile applications along the way.

Entrepreneurship

Bhavik is an entrepreneur with a portfolio of investments in telecoms, technology, media, and entertainment. He is also motivational speaker; he delivered the keynote speech at Stockholm School of Entrepreneurship Startup Day 2007.

See also
 History of Atlantic crossings by rowing

External links
 Bhavik Gandhi's home page

References

Living people
Indian sailors
Indian motivational speakers
Year of birth missing (living people)